Triglia is a former municipality in Chalkidiki, Greece. Since the 2011 local government reform it is part of the municipality Nea Propontida, of which it is a municipal unit. The municipal unit has an area of 121.959 km2. Population 5,862 (2011). The seat of the municipality was in Nea Triglia.

International relations

Triglia is twinned with:

 Rafina, Greece
 Tirilye, Turkey

References

External links

Populated places in Chalkidiki